Wayne Allan Kimber (1949 – 22 May 2004) was a New Zealand politician of the National Party. He was born in Auckland in 1949.

Professional career
Kimber was a town planner by profession and worked for Gisborne City Council. His research led to the establishment of the Greater East Cape Tourism Council, which was renamed to Eastland Tourism Council and then Tourism Eastland.

He went to Waipawa in 1997, where he had an executive role with Central Hawke's Bay District Council, including its acting chief executive. He moved to Taranaki and was Chief Executive of the Stratford District Council from 2001 to 2004.

Political career

Kimber was a Gisborne city councillor from 1986 to 1989. He had a leading role during Cyclone Bola.

He represented the electorate of Gisborne in Parliament from 1990 to 1993, when he was defeated by Janet Mackey. He is one of six one-term National MPs who were elected in a swing against Labour in the 1990 election. He was unsuccessful as a list candidate in the 1996 election, when he was ranked in 59th position. He also contested the new  electorate, where he was defeated by Janet Mackey.

Family and death
He married Mandy Shaw in Gisborne in 1985. He died at Waikato Hospital on 22 May 2004 after a short illness, and was survived by his wife, three children and two granddaughters.

References

1949 births
2004 deaths
New Zealand National Party MPs
Members of the New Zealand House of Representatives
New Zealand MPs for North Island electorates
People from Gisborne, New Zealand
People from Stratford, New Zealand
Unsuccessful candidates in the 1996 New Zealand general election
Unsuccessful candidates in the 1993 New Zealand general election